Ervin Chartrand is a Canadian Métis/Ojibwe director, writer and producer.  He is best known for directing the films 504938C (2005) and First Stories: Patrick Ross (2006).

Personal life

Ervin Chartrand is a Métis/Ojibwe from Pine Creek First Nation Camperville, Manitoba, Canada.

Chartrand earned a Bachelor of Arts degree in film studies from the University of Winnipeg in 2017.

Career
Chartrand first began his career in film in 2003, after enrolling in Winnipeg's Aboriginal Broadcast Training Initiative,  sponsored by the Manitoba Indian Cultural Education Centre. He worked as a camera assistant on the APTN TV series The Sharing Circle and the Canadian TV series Tipi Tales as a puppet wrangler.  Chartrand studied acting with the Academy of Broadcasting Corporation in Winnipeg. 

In 2005, Chartrand received the Winnipeg Aboriginal Film Festival, Best New Talent award for the film 504938C (2005).  50938C was created with the support of the Winnipeg Film Group's First Film program. In 2006, he won the Reelworld Film Festival, Reel World Award for Outstanding Canadian Short Film for Patrick Ross (2006). He was invited to direct this short film by the National Film Board of Canada for the movie series First Stories, the Manitoba (Volume I). Patrick Ross also won the 2006 Yorkton Film Festival Golden Sheaf Award - Aboriginal. If this Was Right (2008), a film with rap artist and CBC host Wab Kinew and directed by Chartrand, was nominated for the 2008 Aboriginal Peoples Choice Music Award, Best Music Video.  Chartrand was the winner of the Canwest Mentorship Program at the 2010 imagineNATIVE film + Media Arts Festival.  In 2017, Other Side of The 49th: The Garry Sawatzky Story was nominated for the Yorkton Film Festival Golden Sheaf Award - Documentary History & Biography.

Filmography

Further reading
 Friesen (2016) "Tackling the Gangs 1998-2000" in The Ballad of Danny6 Wolfe: Life of a Modern Outlaw. Penguin Random House Canada Limited. Pg. 133.

References

External links
 Ervin Chartrand on Twitter
 
 Ervin Chartrand on Vimeo

Film directors from Manitoba
First Nations filmmakers
Artists from Manitoba
Living people
University of Manitoba alumni
Year of birth missing (living people)
First Nations screenwriters
Canadian Métis people